Granulifusus williami is a species of sea snail, a marine gastropod mollusk in the family Fasciolariidae, the spindle snails, the tulip snails and their allies.

Description

Distribution
This marine species occurs in Indonesia and the Society Islands
.

References

External links
 Kantor Y.I., Fedosov A.E., Snyder M.A. & Bouchet P. (2018). Pseudolatirus Bellardi, 1884 revisited, with the description of two new genera and five new species (Neogastropoda: Fasciolariidae). European Journal of Taxonomy. 433: 1-57

williami
Gastropods described in 2006